The 1968 United States Senate election in Utah took place on November 5, 1968. Incumbent Republican Senator Wallace F. Bennett won re-election to a fourth term.

Primary elections
Primary elections were held on September 10, 1968.

Democratic primary

Candidates
Phil L. Hansen, incumbent Attorney General of Utah
Milton L. Weilenmann, State Economic Development Director

Results

Republican primary

Candidates
Mark E. Anderson, lawyer
Wallace F. Bennett, incumbent U.S. Senator

Results

General election

Results

See also 
 1968 United States Senate elections

References

Bibliography
 
 

1968
Utah
United States Senate